Michael Patrick McGill (born July 2, 1973) is an American actor who has appeared in film and television. He is most known for playing Tommy on Shameless.

Slim on Desolation Canyon

Filmography

Film

Television

References

External links
Michael Patrick McGill on IMDb

Living people
1973 births
21st-century American male actors
People from Appleton, Wisconsin